Dectodesis confluens is a species of tephritid or fruit flies in the genus Dectodesis of the family Tephritidae.

Distribution
Tanzania.

References

Tephritinae
Insects described in 1830
Diptera of Africa